Roan Ching-Yueh (born in 1957 in Pingtung, Taiwan) is a Taiwanese architect, writer, curator and a Professor of Department of Art and Design, Yuan Ze University.

Books
He has published more than 30 books in both Taiwan and China, including architecture and literature writings. One of his novels, Lin Xiu-Zhi and Her Family, was included in the 10 best Chinese books of 2004 by Yazhou Zhoukan in Hong Kong.

Awards
He has won literary awards including Taiwan Literature Awards 2001, Taipei Literature Awards 2003 and Wu Yongfu Literature Awards 2003.

The Taiwan Pavilion
Roan was the curator of Taiwan Pavilion in Venice Biennale 2006 of Paradise Revisited: Micro Cities and Non-Meta Architecture in Taiwan. Roan is WEAK! together with Hsieh Ying-chun and Marco Casagrande. The WEAK! operates an independent architectural research centre Ruin Academy as their headquarters in Taipei.

External links 
 Architecture of the WEAK! Robin Peckham, Kunsthalle Kowloon, 2009
 Cicada Nikita Wu, SZHK Biennale, 2009
 WEAK! Architecture News Plus, 2010

References 

Taiwanese architects
1957 births
Writers from Taipei
Living people
21st-century Taiwanese writers
Artists from Taipei
Academic staff of Yuan Ze University
People from Pingtung County
Taiwanese male writers